Ahlat is a town in Turkey's Bitlis Province in Eastern Anatolia Region. It is the seat of Ahlat District. Its population is 27,563 (2021). The town of Ahlat is situated on the northwestern shore of Lake Van. The mayor is Abdulalim Mümtaz Çoban (AKP).

History
Ahlat, known by its Armenian name of Khlat or Chliat in the ancient and medieval period, was once a part of the district of Bznunik'. The town was taken by the Arabs during the reign of Caliph Uthman (644–656); in 645, Uthman instructed the governor of Syria, Mu'awiyah ibn Abi Sufyan, to send Habib ibn Maslama al-Fihri in an expedition to Byzantine-controlled Armenia—although some sources insist that the Caliph commissioned Habib directly. During the next four centuries, Ahlat was ruled by "Arab governors, Armenian princes, and Arab emirs of the Qays tribe". In the early eighth century, Arab tribes settled in the region, and Ahlat became part of the Arab Kaysite principality. Ibn Hawqal (died ca. 978) mentioned Ahlat as an important stopover point on the Urmia-Mayyafariqin trade route. In about 983, Ahlat was controlled by a Kurdish chief named Bāḏ (in Armenian spelled as "Bat"); thereafter, Ahlat was associated with the Kurdish Marwanids (centered in Diyar Bakr), which sprang from Bāḏ. In the winter of 998, the Curopalates David III of Tao besieged Khlat but was unable to capture it, partly because of his contemptuous treatment towards its Armenian population. In 1057, Herve Phrangopoulos retreated here with 300 Norman knights after breaking with Michael VI but was betrayed by Aponosar (Abu Nasr), the emir of the city.

After the Battle of Manzikert (1071), the Seljuk army, led personally by Sultan Alp Arslan (1063-1072), took possession of the town. The Seljuks then gave control over the town to the Turkmen slave commander Sökmen el-Kutbî (or al-Qutbi). Sökmen and his successors were known as the Shah-Armens (or Ahlat-Shahs) and made Ahlat their capital. In the 11th century accounts of Nasir Khusraw (in his Safarnama) the town of "Akhlat" is mentioned. According to the Institute of Ismaili Studies (who cite Thackston, W. Wheeler McIntosh, ed. trans., Nasir-i Khusraw’s Book of Travels (Costa Mesa, CA: Mazda Publishers, 2010), 8.), the excerpt goes as follows: "From there (Harran) we arrived in the city of Akhlat on the 18th of Jumada al-Awwal [November 20 CE]. This city is the border town between the Muslims and Armenians, and from Bekri it is nineteen leagues. The Prince, Nasruddawla, was over a hundred years old and had many sons, to each of whom he had given a district. In the city of Akhlat they speak three languages: Arabic, Persian, and Armenian. It is my supposition that this is why they named the town Akhlat. Their commercial transactions are carried out in puls (possibly ancient Roman and Greek coins), and their rotel (Armenian money) is equivalent to three hundred dirhems."

With the decline of the Seljuks, and the new political upheaval presented by the invasions of the Khwarezmian Empire and the Mongol Empire, Ahlat became briefly disputed between the Ayyubids, the Kingdom of Georgia and the Sultanate of Rum (the Anatolian branch of the Seljuq dynasty). In the 12th century, Ahlat and its adjacent territory was conquered and vassalized by the Kingdom of Georgia. In this period Georgians called city by name Khlati, modified native Armenian name Khlat. Following the Battle of Köse Dağ (1243) and the fall of Baghdad (1258), Ahlat, "together with eastern Anatolia and upper Mesopotamia", became part of the Mongol Empire. The Mongols added Ahlat to the Ilkhanate division, and in the ensuing period, the Ilkhanid rulers minted coins in Ahlat. According to Hamdallah Mustawfi (died 1349), the revenues provided by Ahlat under the Ilkhanids, amounted up to 51,500 dinars. After the Ilkhanate, Ahlat became part of the Jalayirids and then the Ak Koyunlu.

In the early 16th century, the Ottomans expanded into Eastern Anatolia (Western Armenia), taking control of the town for the first time under Sultan Selim I (1512-1520). Nevertheless, Ahlat remained only loosely under Ottoman control at the time, for it was considered to be a border district between the Ottoman Empire and Safavid Empire. In 1526, during the reign of king (shah) Tahmasp I (1524-1576), Ahlat was in Safavid hands, and its governor was Delu Montasha Ustajlu. In 1533, during the Ottoman–Safavid War of 1532–1555, Ahlat was taken by the Ottoman army led by Grand Vizier Pargalı Ibrahim Pasha. In 1548, Ahlat was recaptured by the Safavids, who then sacked it. During Suleiman the Magnificent's reign (1520-1566), Ahlat eventually became a solid part of the Ottoman Empire. However, "in practise", Ahlat remained de facto under the control of various local Kurdish chiefs until the mid-19th century, when the central Ottoman government in Constantinople imposed direct rule on the town. Vital Cuinet estimated the population of Ahlat at end of the 19th century at 23,700. According to Cuinet, seventy percent were Muslims, whereas the rest were Christians, mostly Armenians. When Cuinet passed through the city during this time period, ancient Ahlat was considered to be "abandoned", and was referred to as Kharab Şehir, i.e. "the ruined town". Later, a new town, which had a population of 5,018 in 1961, grew some two kilometers to the east on the shore of Lake Van.

During the Circassian genocide, several Circassian refugees from the North Caucasus were settled in Ahlat district and established a few villages.

As part of the deportations of Kurds from 1916 to 1934, Kurds from Ahlat were deported to Diyarbakır for being disloyal to the Committee of Union and Progress. It was already noted in 1846 by Ottoman officials that the town could be used to control the Kurds with an iron fist since it was located 'in the heart of Kurdistan'.

Modern day
Ahlat and its surroundings are known for a large number of historic tombstones left by the Ahlatshah dynasty, also known as the Shah-Armen, Shah-i-Arman, or Ahlat-Shah dynasty. Efforts are presently being made by local authorities with a view to including the Tombstones of Ahlat the Urartian and Ottoman citadel on UNESCO's World Heritage List, where they are currently listed tentatively.

In recent years, Ahlat also came to be known for the quality of its potatoes, which carved themselves a sizable share in the Turkish agricultural products market.

Gallery

Climate

Notable people 

 Sayyid Husayn Ahlati (d. 1397), Kurdish occulist, lettrist and personal physician-alchemist to Sultan Barquq  
 Şêx Şemsedînê Exlatî (1588–1674), Kurdish Sufi, poet and Sheikh

See also
 Ahlatshahs
 Cave dwellings of Ahlat
 The Tombstones of Ahlat the Urartian and Ottoman citadel

References

Sources

Further reading

External links
 Pictures of the sights by private photographer

 
Towns in Turkey
Populated places in Bitlis Province
Ahlat District
Kurdish settlements in Bitlis Province
Cittaslow